Edward Neil Bettridge (born September 16, 1940) is a former American football player who played one season with the Cleveland Browns. He played college football at Bowling Green State University. His dad was John Bettridge.

References

1940 births
Living people
American football linebackers
Bowling Green Falcons football players
Cleveland Browns players
Players of American football from Ohio
Sportspeople from Sandusky, Ohio